Cam Clarke is an American voice actor, known for his work in animation, video games and commercials. Among his notable roles are Leonardo and Rocksteady in the 1987 Teenage Mutant Ninja Turtles animated series, Shotaro Kaneda in the 1989 original Streamline Pictures English dub of Akira, and Liquid Snake in the Metal Gear series. He often serves as a voice double for Matthew Broderick and served as Broderick's singing voice of Simba in The Lion King II: Simba's Pride.

Career

Clarke began his acting career in The Hollywood Palace as The King Family Show. He continued to perform with his family on various television specials until the 1980s when he got his first voice acting roles in Snorks and Robotech. He was taught by Michael Bell.

To date, Clarke has voiced over four hundred titles. From 1987 until 1996, Cam Clarke would most notably portray Leonardo, the leader of the Teenage Mutant Ninja Turtles as well as Rocksteady, one of the show's antagonists. Clarke would reprise the role of Leonardo in non-musical spoken portions of the first show of the TMNT: Coming Out of Their Shells concerts designed around the Ninja Turtle characters held at Radio City Music Hall, though the later VHS tape released of the event leaves him uncredited.

Personal life
Clarke is the nephew to guitarist Alvino Rey and pianist Buddy Cole, cousin to actress Tina Cole, actor and TMNT co-star Pat Fraley, and writer Chris Conkling, half brother to musicians Ric and Lex de Azevedo, and uncle to voice actress Emilie Brown and actress Rachel Coleman.

Clarke is gay, and his experiences inspired his album Inside Out, which changed pronouns in lyrics of classic songs and his one-man autobiographical play Stop Me If I Told You This.

Clarke is a survivor of HIV, having lived with it for decades.

Filmography

Animation

 Rachel & the TreeSchoolers – Bongo, Hue
 The Twisted Tales of Felix the Cat – Poindexter, Additional voices, Pons The Powerboy, Whale, Devil Pigs, Mr. Hat
 The Zula Patrol – Multo, Bula, Pluto, Saturn
 This Is America, Charlie Brown – Snoopy (singing) ("The Music and Heroes of America")
 Timon & Pumbaa – Simba (speaking voice)
 Totally Spies! - Brock Williams
 Ultimate Spider-Man – Piledriver, Captain Ultra
 Where's Waldo? – Additional voices
 Widget the World Watcher – Additional voices
 W.I.T.C.H. – Dean Collins, Meridian Alderman, MacGruder, Max the Photocopier, Drake
 Wild Grinders – Emo Crys, Track Hucksterball

Anime dubbing

 Around the World with Willy Fog – Rigadon, Johnson, Ralph (as Jimmy Flinders)
 Bleach – Kagerōza Inaba
 Cagaster of an Insect Cage – Tariq
 Dogtanian and the Three Muskehounds – Dogtanian (as Jimmy Flinders)
 Doomed Megalopolis – Junichi Narutaki
 Duel Masters – Toru, Shori, Stu: Game Announcer #2
 Fate/Apocrypha – Caster of Black
 G-Force: Guardians of Space – Dirk Daring, Red Impulse
 Honey and Clover – Takumi Mayama
 Hunter X Hunter – Peggy
 Macron 1 – Jason Templar (as Jimmy Flinders)
 JoJo's Bizarre Adventure: Stardust Crusaders – Daniel J. D'Arby/D'Arby Elder
 March Comes In like a Lion – Masachika Kōda
 Marvel Anime: X-Men – Professor X
 Monster – Richard Braun
 Monsuno: World Master – Chase Suno, Jeredy Suno, Dr. Emmanuel Klipse, additional voices
 Mosaic – Stephan
 Naruto – Aoi Rokushō
 Naruto Special: Mission: Protect the Waterfall Village! – Suien
 Robotech – Max Sterling, Lance "Lancer" Belmont (as Jimmy Flinders)
 Saber Rider and the Star Sheriffs – Additional voices
 Saint Seiya: The Lost Canvas – Pope Sage
 The Promised Neverland - Demon (Ep. 3), Demon B (Ep. 1)
 Zetman – Gorou Kanzaki (as Adam Nevel)

Films

Feature films
 Akira – Shōtarō Kaneda, Councilman 1, Scientist 2 (as Jimmy Flinders, Streamline dub)
 Aladdin – Aladdin, additional voices
 A Turtle's Tale: Sammy's Adventures – Seagull
 A Turtle's Tale 2: Sammy's Escape from Paradise – Seagull 1 (as Clark Kelly)
 Barnyard: The Original Party Animals – Freddy 
 Big Hero 6 – Additional voices
 Clifford's Really Big Movie - Mark Howard, Marcus
 Hotel Transylvania – Additional voices
 Peter-No-Tail in Americat - Peter-No-Tail 
 Pinocchio – Talking Cricket, The Fox and the Cat, Candlewick
 Tales of the Black Freighter – Money Lender
 The Pirates Who Don't Do Anything: A VeggieTales Movie – Robert the Terrible, The King
 The Smurfs and the Magic Flute – Peewit 
 Tooth Fairy – Voice Cast
 Underdog – Supershep, Little Brown Dog
 Warriors of the Wind – Prince Milo

Direct-to-video and television films
 Bleach: The DiamondDust Rebellion – Yasochika Iemura (English Version)
 Codename: Kids Next Door - Operation: Z.E.R.O. - Additional voices
 Dot and Spot's Magical Christmas – Spot
 The GodThumb – Adopted Lawyer Son
 Grandma Got Run Over by a Reindeer – Austin Bucks
 Lego Batman: The Movie – DC Super Heroes Unite – Green Lantern, Martian Manhunter
 The New Adventures of Peter Rabbit - Peter Rabbit
 The Lion King 1½ – Additional voices
 The Lion King II: Simba's Pride – Simba (singing voice)
 The Little Mermaid II: Return to the Sea – Flounder
 Monster High: Fright On! – Heath Burns, HooDude VooDoo, Van Hellscream, Romulus
 Monster High: Why Do Ghouls Fall in Love? – Heath Burns, Mr. Rotter, Hep Clouds, Valentine's Mother
 Monster High: Escape from Skull Shores – Heath Burns, Ghost
 Monster High: Ghouls Rule – Heath Burns, Mr Rotter, Goon No. 2
 Monster High - Scaris: City of Frights – Heath Burns, Mr. Rotter
 Monster High: 13 Wishes – Heath Burns, Mr Rotter, narrator
 Monster High: Friday Night Frights – Heath Burns, Romulus
 Monster High: Frights, Camera, Action! – Heath Burns, Mr Rotter, Ygor, Hoodude Voodoo, Vampire Dignitary No. 3, Crow No. 1
 Monster High: Freaky Fusion – Heath Burns, Mr Rotter, Hoodube Voodoo
 Monster High: Haunted – Heath Burns, Ghost Student, Mr Rotter, Hoodude Voodoo
 Monster High: Boo York, Boo York – Heath Burns, Hoodude Voodoo, Mr Rotter
 Mulan II – Loop Group
 Naruto the Movie: Ninja Clash in the Land of Snow – Sōsetsu Kazahana
 The Nuttiest Nutcracker – The Prince
 Scooby-Doo on Zombie Island – Detective Beau Neville

Video games
 La Pucelle: Tactics – Yattanya (English version)
 Til' Morning's Light – Ghost Antagonist

 Alundra 2 – Pierre/Pirate 1/Madd Flower (English version)
 Assassin's Creed II – Subject Sixteen
 Assassin's Creed: Brotherhood – Subject Sixteen
 Armored Core: Verdict Day – The Foundation Man, CPU Voice (as Cam Clark)
 Baldur's Gate: Dark Alliance – Fayed, Vahn, additional voices
 Baldur's Gate II: Shadows of Amn – Drizzt Do'Urden, Aran Linvail, additional voices
 Beneath a Steel Sky – Reich (CD version)
 Bravely Second: End Layer – Kaiser Oblivion (English version)
 Call of Duty: United Offensive – Pvt. Anderson, Sasha, additional voices
 Champions of Norrath – Additional voices
 Champions: Return to Arms – Additional voices
 Crackdown 2 – Additional voices
 Clash of the Titans – Philokrates, Fisherman, Soldiers, Spirits
 Dead Island – Roger Howard, additional voices
 Disney Dreamlight Valley – Simba
 Dragon Age: Origins – Additional voices
 Dragon Age: Origins – Awakening – Herren, Kendrick, additional voices
 Doom 3 – IPN Newscaster Roger Mcallen, additional voices
 EOE: Eve of Extinction – Josh Calloway (English version)
 Escape from Monkey Island – Clive the Jambalaya Tourist, Meathook
 Enter the Gungeon – Agunim
 Eternal Darkness: Sanity's Requiem – Anthony the Paige, Custodian
 Eternal Sonata – Prince Crescendo (uncredited) (English version)
 EverQuest II – Assistant Tillheel, Captain Santis, Vondorinsarnoo, additional voices
 Fallout: New Vegas: Old World Blues DLC – Dr. Mobius
 Fallout: Brotherhood of Steel – Vault Man, Patrol, Plasma, Kamikaze Robot
 Final Fantasy XIII/XIII-2 – Cocoon Inhabitants (English version)
 Final Fantasy XIV: A Realm Reborn – Lord Lolorito Nanarito (English version)
 Fire Emblem Fates – Male Avatar/Corrin (voice 1) (English version)
 Fire Emblem Heroes – Corrin (Male), Arthur (voice) (English version)
 Fire Emblem Warriors - Corrin (Male)
 Freddy Pharkas: Frontier Pharmacist – Freddy Pharkas
 Galleon – Sultan
 God of War II – Hercules (scrapped in final version but is still credited)
 Grandia II – Ryudo, Father Carius, Risotto
 Guild Wars II – Al'batubar
 Gungrave: Overdose – Juji Kabane, Richard Wong (English version)
 Halo Wars – Flamethrower
 Hearthstone: One Night in Karazhan – Medivh
 The Hobbit – Additional voices
 The Incredible Hulk: Ultimate Destruction – Additional voices
 Jade Empire – Sky, Si Pat, additional voices
 JumpStart Toddlers - Chippy, Mr. Mouse
 Just Cause – Kleiner
 Killer7 – Andrei Ulmeyda (English version)
 Kinect Fun Labs: Kinect Rush – A Disney Pixar Adventure: Snapshot – Additional voices
 Kingdom Hearts II – Simba (English version)
 Kingdom of Paradise – Kairoku, Hokaku (English version)
 Kingdoms of Amalur: Reckoning – Additional voices
 Legaia 2: Duel Saga – Lang (uncredited) (English version)
 Lego Batman 2: DC Super Heroes – Green Lantern, Martian Manhunter, Nightwing, Joker Henchman
 Lego The Lord of the Rings – Various different characters in Middle Earth
 Lightning Returns: Final Fantasy XIII – Fleeing Man, Resident, Goddess's Disciple (English version)
 The Lord of the Rings: The Battle for Middle-earth II: The Rise of the Witch-king – King Arveleg
 Lost Planet 2 – Additional voices (English version)
 Mass Effect – Private Fredericks, additional Voices
 Marvel: Ultimate Alliance – Thor, Daredevil, Weasel, Heimdall
 Masters of the Universe: He-Man: Defender of Grey Skull – He-Man/Prince Adam/Sphinx
 Medal of Honor: Allied Assault – Additional voices
 Metal Gear Solid – Liquid Snake (English version; credited as James Flinders)
 Metal Gear Solid 2: Sons of Liberty – Liquid Snake (English version)
 Metal Gear Solid: The Twin Snakes – Liquid Snake (English version)
 Metal Gear Solid: Digital Graphic Novel – Liquid Snake (English version)
 Metal Gear Solid 2: Digital Graphic Novel – Liquid Snake (English version)
 Naruto: The Broken Bond – Aoi (English version)
 Neverwinter Nights – Various
 Nickelodeon All-Star Brawl - Leonardo (voiceover added in the June 2022 update)
 Nickelodeon Kart Racers 3: Slime Speedway - Leonardo
 Nine Hours, Nine Persons, Nine Doors – Ninth Man
 Painkiller – Daniel
 Painkiller: Battle out of Hell – Daniel
 Quest for Glory IV – Domovoi, Gypsy Davy, Nikolai
 Red Dead Redemption 2 – The Local Pedestrian Population
 Return to Castle Wolfenstein – Nazi Soldier No. 4
 Rise of the Argonauts – Additional voices
 Rise of the Dragon – William Blade Hunter
 Robotech: Battlecry – Jack Archer
 Sacrifice – Additional voices
 Scooby-Doo and the Spooky Swamp - Costington
 Scooby-Doo! First Frights – Coach Hayes, Costington, Tim "The Toyman" Toiler
 Shadow of Rome – Marcus Brutus, additional voices
 Shadows of the Damned – Christopher, Demons (English version)
 Shark Tale – Eel Boss, Teenboy Fish, Paper-Sales Fish
 Shenmue III – Sun JiuSi (English version)
 Skylanders series
 Giants – Additional voices
 Spyro's Adventure – Ship Master, additional voices
 Superchargers – Additional voices
 Trap Team - Blobbers, Beta Blobbers, Meta Lobs, additional voices
 Sly Cooper: Thieves in Time – Monkey Guard
 Soldier of Fortune II: Double Helix – Anthony Michaels
 Spyro: Reignited Trilogy - Cosmos, Agent Zero, Additional Voices
 The Spiderwick Chronicles – Thimbletack / Knocker
 Super Smash Bros. for Nintendo 3DS and Wii U – Corrin (Male) (English version)
 Super Smash Bros. Ultimate – Corrin (Male) (English version)
 Star Trek: Starfleet Command II: Empires at War – Additional voices
 Star Trek: Starfleet Command III – Additional voices
 Star Wars: Knights of the Old Republic – Trask Ulgo, additional voices
 Star Wars Jedi Knight: Jedi Academy – Additional voices
 Star Wars Jedi Knight II: Jedi Outcast – Additional voices
 Star Wars: The Old Republic – Tai Cordan, Nyranos, additional voices
 Sword of the Berserk: Guts' Rage – Puck (English version)
 Tales of Legendia  - Will Raynard
 Tales of Symphonia – Kratos Aurion (English version)
 Teenage Mutant Ninja Turtles (Mobile) – Leonardo, Rocksteady
 Teenage Mutant Ninja Turtles: Shredder's Revenge - Leonardo
 The Amazing Spider-Man vs. The Kingpin – Doctor Octopus, Police Officer
 The Grim Adventures of Billy & Mandy – Melvin
 The Secret of Monkey Island: Special Edition – Meathook
 The Thing – Weldon (uncredited)
 WildStar – Chua
 World of Warcraft: The Burning Crusade – Blood Elf Male, Medivh, Nexus-Prince Shaffar
 World of Warcraft: Wrath of the Lich King – Malygos
 World of Warcraft: Cataclysm – Fandral Staghelm, Peroth'arn
 World of Warcraft: Shadowlands – Lord Chamberlain
 Xenogears – Krelian (English version)
 Yakuza (video game) – Takashi
 Zombie Dinos from Planet Zeltoid – Dexter

Live action
 Flip That House – Narrator
 Walker, Texas Ranger – A.R.T.
 Troops – Captain Jyanix Bach
 True Blood – Narrator, Vampire Vocal Effects
 Tales from the Crypt – Dudley Pig, Bailiff Wolf
 Hawaii Five-0 – Season seven, voice of Steve McGarrett (as Jack Lord).
 IZombie – Zombie vocalizations

Audiobooks
 The Mystery of Smuggler's Cove (1985) Hardy Boys

Theater
 Noah: The Musical – Citizen of Land of Nod
 Stop Me If I Told You This – Himself

Other
 The Dark Crystal – Jen (read-along cassette story recording)
 "The World of Snoopy" – Snoopy (Animatronic toy and read-along cassette series)
 Circle of Life: An Environmental Fable – Simba
 American Psycho – FanMoy

Staff work
 Christmas with the King Family – Consulting Producer
 Labyrinth of Crete – Casting Director
 Lego Batman: The Movie – DC Super Heroes Unite – Casting and Voice Director
 Lego Batman 2: DC Super Heroes – Voice Director
 Rachel & the TreeSchoolers – Character Voice Casting Director

Discography
 Inside Out (1999)
 Return to Pride Rock: Songs Inspired by Disney's The Lion King II: Simba's Pride
 Saturday's Warrior (Original Cast Recording) (1978)

References

External links

 
 
 
 

Living people
American casting directors
American gay actors
American male child actors
American male video game actors
American male voice actors
American voice directors
Audiobook narrators
King family (show business)
LGBT Latter Day Saints
LGBT people from California
Male actors from Los Angeles
Year of birth missing (living people)
20th-century American male actors
21st-century American male actors
21st-century American LGBT people